

Events

January

 January 1 – Cuba: Fulgencio Batista flees Havana when the forces of Fidel Castro advance.
 January 2 – Soviet lunar probe Luna 1 is the first man-made object to attain escape velocity from Earth. It reaches the vicinity of Earth's Moon, where it was intended to crash-land, but instead becomes the first spacecraft to go into heliocentric orbit.
 January 3
 Alaska is admitted as the 49th U.S. state.
 The southernmost island of the Maldives archipelago, Addu Atoll, declares its independence from the Kingdom of the Maldives, initiating the United Suvadive Republic.
 January 4
 In Cuba, rebel troops led by Che Guevara and Camilo Cienfuegos enter the city of Havana.
 Léopoldville riots: At least 49 people are killed during clashes between the police and participants of a meeting of the ABAKO Party in Léopoldville in the Belgian Congo.
 January 6 – The International Maritime Organization is inaugurated.
 January 7 – The United States recognizes the new Cuban government of Fidel Castro.
 January 8 – Charles de Gaulle is inaugurated as the first president of the French Fifth Republic.
 January 9 – The Vega de Tera disaster in Spain, a flood caused by a dam collapse, nearly destroys the town of Ribadelago and kills 144 residents.
 January 10 – The Soviet government recognizes the new Castro government of Cuba.
 January 11 – The Confédération Mondiale des Activités Subaquatiques is founded in Monaco.
 January 15 – The Soviet Union conducts its first census after World War II.
 January 21 – The European Court of Human Rights is established.
 January 22 – Knox Mine disaster: Water breaches the River Slope Mine in Port Griffith, near Pittston, Pennsylvania; 12 miners are killed.
 January 25
 American Airlines begins the first U.S. domestic jet service with a Boeing 707 airliner flight between New York and Los Angeles.
 Pope John XXIII announces that the Second Vatican Council will be convened in Rome.
 January 29 – Walt Disney releases his 16th animated film, Sleeping Beauty in Beverly Hills. It is Disney's first animated film to be shown in 70mm and modern 6-track stereophonic sound, but its last fairytale adaptation until 1989. Also on the program is Disney's new "pictorial interpretation" Grand Canyon, which uses the music of Ferde Grofé's Grand Canyon Suite. Grand Canyon wins an Academy Award for Best Documentary (Short Subject).
 January 30 – Danish passenger/cargo ship , returning to Copenhagen after its maiden voyage to Greenland, strikes an iceberg and sinks off the Greenland coast with the loss of all 95 on board.

February

 February 2 – Nine ski hikers mysteriously perish in the northern Ural Mountains in the Dyatlov Pass incident and are all found dead a few weeks later.
 February 3
 A chartered plane transporting musicians Buddy Holly, Ritchie Valens and The Big Bopper with pilot Roger Peterson goes down in foggy conditions near Clear Lake, Iowa, killing all four on board. The tragedy is later termed "The Day the Music Died", popularized in Don McLean's 1971 song "American Pie".
 American Airlines Flight 320, a Lockheed L-188 Electra from Chicago crashes into the East River on approach to New York City's LaGuardia Airport, killing 65 of the 73 people on board.
 February 6 – At Cape Canaveral, Florida, the first successful test firing of a Titan intercontinental ballistic missile is accomplished.
 February 9 – Yugoslavia and Spain set trade relations (not diplomatic ones).
 February 13 – TAT-2, AT&T's second transatlantic telephone cable goes into operation between Newfoundland and France.
 February 16 – Fidel Castro becomes Premier of Cuba.
 February 17 – Vanguard 2, the first weather satellite, is launched to measure cloud cover for the United States Navy.
 February 18
 Jesús Sosa Blanco, a colonel in the  Cuban army of Fulgencio Batista, is executed in Cuba after being convicted of committing 108 murders for Batista.
 Women in Nepal vote for the first time.
 February 19 – First of the London and Zürich Agreements under which the United Kingdom agrees to grant independence to Cyprus.
 February 20 – The Canadian Government cancels the Avro Canada CF-105 Arrow interceptor aircraft project.

March

 March 1
 Archbishop Makarios returns to Cyprus from exile.
 March 3 – Lunar probe Pioneer 4 becomes the first American object to escape dominance by Earth's gravity.
 March 9 – Mattel's Barbie doll debuts in the United States.
 March 10 – The Tibetan uprising erupts in Lhasa when Chinese officials attempt to arrest the Dalai Lama.
 March 11 – The Eurovision Song Contest 1959, staged in Cannes, is won for the Netherlands by "'n Beetje" sung by Teddy Scholten (music by Dick Schallies, lyrics by Willy van Hemert).
 March 17 – Tenzin Gyatso, 14th Dalai Lama escapes Tibet and arrives in India.
 March 18 – U.S. President Dwight D. Eisenhower signs the Hawaii Admission Act, granting statehood to Hawaii.
 March 19 – The other two southern islands of the Maldives, Huvadhu Atoll and Fuvahmulah, join Addu Atoll in forming the United Suvadive Republic (abolished September 1963).
 March 28 – The Kashag, the government of Tibet, is abolished by an order signed by Chinese premier Zhou Enlai. The Dalai Lama is replaced in China by the Panchen Lama.
 March 31 – The Dalai Lama is granted asylum in India.

April

 April 6 – The 31st Academy Awards ceremony is held in Hollywood. Musical film Gigi receives a record 9 Oscars.
 April 8 – The Inter-American Development Bank (IADB) is established.
 April 9 – NASA announces its selection of seven military pilots to become the first U.S. astronauts, later known as the 'Mercury Seven'.
 April 10 – Crown Prince Akihito of Japan marries Shōda Michiko, the first commoner to marry into the Imperial House of Japan.
 April 25 – The  Saint Lawrence Seaway linking the Great Lakes and the Atlantic Ocean officially opens to shipping.
 April 27 – National People's Congress elects Liu Shaoqi as Chairman of the People's Republic of China, as a successor of Mao Zedong.

May

 May – In the United Kingdom:
 Import tariffs are lifted.
 The first Ten Tors event is held on Dartmoor.
 May 2 – 1959 FA Cup Final: Nottingham Forest defeats Luton Town 2–1 at Wembley Stadium.
 May 18 – The National Liberation Committee of Côte d'Ivoire is launched in Conakry, Guinea.
 May 21 – Gypsy: A Musical Fable, starring Ethel Merman in her last new musical, opens on Broadway and runs for 702 performances
 May 24 – British Empire Day is renamed Commonwealth Day.
 May 28 – Jupiter AM-18 rocket launches two primates, Miss Baker and Miss Able, into space from Cape Canaveral in the United States along with living microorganisms and plant seeds. Successful recovery makes them the first living beings to return safely to Earth after space flight.

June

 June 3 
 Singapore becomes a self-governing crown colony of Britain with Lee Kuan Yew as Prime Minister.
 Real Madrid beats Stade Reims 2–0 at Neckarstadion, Stuttgart and wins the 1958–59 European Cup (Association football).
 June 5 – A new government of the State of Singapore is sworn in by Sir William Goode. Two former ministers are re-elected to the Legislative Assembly.
 June 8 – The USS Barbero and United States Postal Service attempt the delivery of mail via Missile Mail.
 June 9 – The USS George Washington is launched as the first submarine to carry ballistic missiles.
 June 14 – A 3-front invasion of the Dominican Republic by exile forces backed by Fidel Castro and Venezuela attempt to overthrow Rafael Trujillo.
 June 18 – The film The Nun's Story, based on the best-selling novel, is released. Audrey Hepburn stars as the title character; she later says that this is her favorite film role. The film is a box-office hit, and is nominated for several Oscars.
 June 23
 Seán Lemass becomes the third Taoiseach of Ireland.
 Convicted Manhattan Project spy Klaus Fuchs is released after nine years in a British prison and allowed to emigrate to Dresden, East Germany where he resumes a scientific career.
 June 26 – Elizabeth II (as monarch of Canada) and United States President Dwight Eisenhower open the Saint Lawrence Seaway.
 June 30 – Twenty-one students are killed and more than a hundred injured when a North American F-100 Super Sabre jet crashes into Miamori Elementary School on the Japanese island of Okinawa. The pilot ejected before the plane struck the school.

July

 July 2 – Prince Albert of Belgium marries Italian Donna Paola Ruffo di Calabria.
 July 4 – With the admission of Alaska as the 49th U.S. state earlier in the year, the 49-star flag of the United States debuts in Philadelphia.
 July 7 – At 14:28 UT Venus occults the star Regulus. The rare event (which will next occur on October 1, 2044) is used to determine the diameter of Venus and the structure of Venus' atmosphere.
 July 9 – Wing Commander Michael Beetham flying a Royal Air Force Vickers Valiant sets a record of 11 hours 27 minutes for a non-stop London-Cape Town flight.
 July 14 – Groups of Kurdish and communist militias rebel in Kirkuk, Iraq against the central government.
 July 17 – The first skull of Australopithecus is discovered by Louis Leakey and his wife Mary in the Olduvai Gorge of Tanzania.
 July 22 – A Kumamoto University medical research group studying Minamata disease concludes that it is caused by mercury.
 July 24 – At the opening of the American National Exhibition in Moscow, United States Vice President Richard Nixon and USSR Premier Nikita Khrushchev engage in the "Kitchen Debate".
 July 25 – The SR.N1 hovercraft crosses the English Channel from Calais to Dover in just over 2 hours, on the 50th anniversary of Louis Blériot's first crossing by heavier-than-air craft.

August

 August 4 – Martial law is declared in Laos.
 August 7
 Explorer program: The United States launches Explorer 6 from the Atlantic Missile Range in Cape Canaveral, Florida.
 The Roseburg Blast in Oregon, caused when a truck carrying explosives catches fire, kills 14 and causes $12 million worth of damage.
 August 8 – A flood in Taiwan kills 2,000.
 August 14 – Explorer 6 sends the first picture of Earth from orbit.
 August 15 – Cyprus gains independence.
 August 17 – In the United States:
 The 1959 Hebgen Lake earthquake in southwest Montana kills 28.
 Miles Davis' influential jazz album Kind of Blue is released.
 August 19 – The Central Treaty Organization (CENTO) is established.
 August 21 – Hawaii is admitted as the 50th and last U.S. state.
 August 26 – The original Mini car, designed by Sir Alec Issigonis, is launched in England.
 August 30 – 1959 South Vietnamese legislative election: South Vietnamese opposition figure Phan Quang Dan is elected to the National Assembly despite soldiers being bussed in to vote for President Ngo Dinh Diem's candidate.
 August 31 – The Workers' Stadium sports venue in Beijing (China) is officially opened.

September

 September 14 – Soviet spacecraft Luna 2 becomes the first man-made object to crash on the Moon.
 September 15–28 – USSR Premier Nikita Khrushchev and his wife tour the United States, at the invitation of U.S. President Dwight David Eisenhower.
 September 16 – The Xerox 914, the first plain paper copier, is introduced to the public.
 September 17 – The hypersonic North American X-15 research aircraft, piloted by Scott Crossfield, makes its first powered flight at Edwards Air Force Base, California.
 September 23 – The , Australia's first passenger roll-on/roll-off diesel ferry, makes her maiden voyage across the Bass Strait.
 September 26
Typhoon Vera hits central Honshū, Japan, as a  Category 5 storm, killing an estimated 5,098, injuring another 38,921, and leaving 1,533,000 homeless. Most of the victims and damage are centered in the Nagoya area.
 First large unit action of the Vietnam War takes place, when two companies of the ARVN's 23rd Division are ambushed by a well-organized Viet Cong force of several hundred, identified as the "2nd Liberation Battalion".
 September 30 – Soviet Union leader Nikita Khrushchev meets Mao Zedong in Beijing.

October

 October 1 – The 10th anniversary of the People's Republic of China is celebrated with pomp across the country.
 October 7 – The Soviet probe Luna 3 sends back the first ever images of the far side of the Moon.
 October 12 – At the national Alianza Popular Revolucionaria Americana Congress in Peru, a group of leftist radicals is expelled from the party; they later form APRA Rebelde.
 October 13 – The United States launches Explorer 7.
 October 21
 The Solomon R. Guggenheim Museum of modern art (designed by Frank Lloyd Wright, who died on April 9) opens to the public in New York City.
 Mau Mau leader Dedan Kimathi is arrested in Nyeri, Kenya.
 October 29 – First appearance of Astérix the Gaul, in a French comic magazine.
 October 31 – Riots break out in the Belgian Congo.

November

 November 1 – In Rwanda, Hutu politician Dominique Mbonyumutwa is beaten up by Tutsi forces, leading to a period of violence known as the wind of destruction.
 November 2 – At a ceremony near Toddington, British Minister of Transport Ernest Marples opens the first section of the M1 Motorway, between Watford and Crick, along with two spur motorways, the M45 and M10. Three decades of large scale motorway construction follow, leading to the rapid expansion of the UK motorway network.
 November 15 – The brutal Clutter family murders are committed in Holcomb, Kansas, inspiring Truman Capote's In Cold Blood (1966).
 November 20 – The Declaration of the Rights of the Child is adopted by the United Nations.
 The MOSFET (metal–oxide–semiconductor field-effect transistor), also known as the MOS transistor, is invented by Mohamed Atalla and Dawon Kahng at Bell Labs in the United States. It revolutionizes the electronics industry, becomes the fundamental building block of the Digital Revolution and goes on to become the most widely manufactured device in history.

December

 December 1 – Cold War: Antarctic Treaty – 12 countries, including the United States and the Soviet Union, sign a landmark treaty that sets aside Antarctica as a scientific preserve and bans military activity on the continent (the first arms control agreement established during the Cold War).
 December 2 – Malpasset Dam in southern France collapses and water flows over the town of Fréjus, killing 412.
 December 8 – The life-boat Mona, based at Broughty Ferry in Scotland, capsizes during a rescue attempt with the loss of 8 lives.
 December 11 – Charles Robberts Swart is appointed the 11th Governor-General of the Union of South Africa.
 December 14 – Makarios III is selected as the first president of Cyprus.

Date unknown
 Nylon tights, popularly called pantyhose or sheer tights, are first sold on the open market as 'Panti-Legs' by Glen Raven Knitting Mills in the United States.
 The first known human with HIV dies in the Congo.
 The current (as of 2006) design of the Japanese 10 yen coin is put into circulation.
 The Caspian tiger becomes extinct in Iran.
 The Henney Kilowatt goes on sale in the United States, becoming the first production electric car in almost three decades, but only 47 models will be sold in its 2-year production run.
 Car tailfin design reaches its apex in the United States with such as the Cadillac Eldorado, Chevrolet Impala second generation model, Dodge Silver Challenger and Imperial Crown Sedan.

Births

January
 January 1 – Azali Assoumani, President of the Comoros
 January 4 – Vanity, Canadian singer and actress (d. 2016)
 January 9 – Rigoberta Menchú, Guatemalan recipient of the Nobel Peace Prize
 January 16 – Sade, Nigerian-English singer
 January 17
 Susanna Hoffs, American rock vocalist
 Momoe Yamaguchi, Japanese singer
 January 22 – Linda Blair, American actress
 January 24 – Kevin Magee, American basketball player (d. 2003)
 January 27 – Keith Olbermann, American news anchor and sportscaster 
 January 30 – Jody Watley, African-American singer

February
 February 1 – Wade Wilson, American football player and coach (d. 2019)
 February 4 – Lawrence Taylor, American football player
 February 5 – Jennifer Granholm, Canadian-American politician, 47th Governor of Michigan (2003–2011)
 February 8 
 Andrew Hoy, Australian equestrian
 Mauricio Macri, President of Argentina
 February 9 – Joachim Kunz, East German Olympic weightlifter
 February 13  Benur Pashayan, Soviet Armenian Greco-Roman wrestler (d. 2019)
 February 14 – Renée Fleming, American soprano
 February 16 – John McEnroe, American tennis player
 February 18 – Jayne Atkinson, English-born American film, theatre and television actress
 February 22 – Kyle MacLachlan, American actor
 February 23 – Clayton Anderson, American astronaut
 February 26 – Rolando Blackman, Panamanian basketball player

March
 March 1 – Nick Griffin, British politician
 March 4 – Irina Strakhova, Russian race walker
 March 5 – Vazgen Sargsyan, 8th Prime Minister of Armenia (d. 1999)
 March 6 – Tom Arnold, American actor and comedian
 March 7 – Donna Murphy, American actress and singer
 March 8 – Aidan Quinn, Irish-American actor
 March 9 – Takaaki Kajita, Japanese nuclear physicist, recipient of the Nobel Prize in Physics
 March 11 – Dejan Stojanović, Serbian-American poet, writer, essayist and businessman
 March 13 – Kathy Hilton, American socialite and philanthropist
 March 15 – Eliot Teltscher, American tennis player
 March 16 – Jens Stoltenberg, 27th Prime Minister of Norway
 March 17 – Danny Ainge, American basketball player, coach and baseball player
 March 18 
 Luc Besson, French film producer, writer and director
 Irene Cara, American singer and actress (d. 2022)
 March 21 – Nobuo Uematsu, Japanese composer
 March 22 – Matthew Modine, American actor
 March 28 – Laura Chinchilla, 49th president of Costa Rica
 March 30 – Andrew Bailey, executive director banking and chief cashier at the Bank of England

April
 April 2 
 Alberto Fernández, President of Argentina
 Badou Ezzaki, Moroccan football player and manager
 April 3 – David Hyde Pierce, American actor
 April 15 – Adriano Ruchini, Italian businessman
 Emma Thompson, English actress
 April 16 – Alison Ramsay, Scottish field hockey player
 April 17 – Sean Bean, British actor
 April 21 – Robert Smith, lead vocalist of The Cure
 April 22 – Ryan Stiles, American-Canadian comedian
 April 24 – Paula Yates, British television presenter (d. 2000)
 April 26 – Pedro Pierluisi, Governor of Puerto Rico 
 April 27 – Sheena Easton, Scottish singer
 April 30 – Stephen Harper, 22nd Prime Minister of Canada

May
 May 1 – Yasmina Reza, French playwright, actress, novelist and screenwriter
 May 3
 Uma Bharti, Chief Minister of Madhya Pradesh
 Ben Elton, British comedian and writer
 May 9 
 Christian Bach, Argentine-Mexican actress and producer of telenovelas (d. 2019)
 János Áder, President of Hungary
 May 10 – Victoria Rowell, American actress
 May 12 – Ving Rhames, African-American actor
 May 14 – Patrick Bruel, French singer
 May 17 – Marcelo Loffreda, Argentine rugby player and coach
 May 20 – Israel Kamakawiwoʻole, Hawaiian singer (d. 1997)
 May 21 – Loretta Lynch, American politician, 83rd United States Attorney General
 May 22
 David Blatt, Israeli-American professional basketball player and coach
 Morrissey, British singer
 May 24 – Pelle Lindbergh, Swedish-born hockey player (d. 1985)
 May 27 – Donna Strickland, Canadian physicist, recipient of the Nobel Prize in Physics
 May 29 – Rupert Everett, British actor

June
 June 10
 Carlo Ancelotti, Italian football player and manager
 Eliot Spitzer, American politician and governor of New York
 June 11 – Hugh Laurie, British actor, comedian and musician
 June 13 – Klaus Iohannis, President of Romania 
 June 15 – Eileen Davidson, American actress and author
 June 16 – The Ultimate Warrior, American professional wrestler (d. 2014)
 June 17 – Ulrike Richter, German swimmer
 June 19 
 Anne Hidalgo, French politician, Mayor of Paris (2014-present)
 Christian Wulff, Federal President of Germany  
 June 21 
 Guerrinha, Brazilian basketball coach and basketball player
 Marcella Detroit, American soprano vocalist, guitarist and songwriter
 Louis Febre, Mexican composer
 June 22 – Wayne Federman, American comedian, actor and author
 June 24 – Andy McCluskey, English musician and songwriter (OMD)
 June 27
 Khadja Nin, Burundian singer and musician
 Pétur Pétursson, Icelandic footballer
 June 29 – Gina Alajar, Filipino film and television actress and television director
 June 30 – Vincent D'Onofrio, American actor

July
 July 1 
 Mohamed Lemine Ould Guig, Mauritanian academic and political figure
 Giovanni D'Aleo, Italian long-distance runner
 July 4 – Victoria Abril, Spanish actress and singer
 July 5 
 María Concepción Navarrete, Mexican politician
 Marc Cohn, American singer-songwriter
 July 6 – Richard Dacoury, French basketball player
 July 7 – Barbara Krause, German swimmer
 July 8 
 Robert Knepper, American actor
 Jean-Philippe Écoffey, Swiss actor
 Mikhail Zingarevich, Russian entrepreneur and philanthropist
 July 9
 Jim Kerr, Scottish rock singer (Simple Minds)
 Kevin Nash, American professional wrestler
 July 10 – Anjani, American singer-songwriter and pianist
 July 11
 Richie Sambora, American musician
 Suzanne Vega, American singer
 July 12 
 King Tupou VI of Tonga
 Charlie Murphy, African-American actor and comedian (d. 2017)
 July 14
 Susana Martinez, American politician, Governor of New Mexico
 Lynn Bertholet, Swiss bank executive
 July 15
 Vincent Lindon, French actor and filmmaker
 Patrick Timsit, French comedian, writer and film director
 July 19 – Juan J. Campanella, Argentinian filmmaker
 July 20 – Giovanna Amati, Italian racing driver
 July 21 – Gene Miles, Australian rugby league player 
 July 25 – Fyodor Cherenkov, Russian footballer and manager (d. 2014)
 July 26
 Rick Bragg, American journalist
 Kevin Spacey, American actor
 July 27 – Hugh Green, American football player
 July 29
 Sanjay Dutt, Indian actor
 Ruud Janssen, Dutch artist
 July 30 − Abdullah of Pahang, current Yang di-Pertuan Agong of Malaysia

August
 August 3
 John C. McGinley, American actor
 Koichi Tanaka, Japanese scientist, recipient of the Nobel Prize in Chemistry
 August 4 – Robbin Crosby, American rock guitarist (Ratt) (d. 2002)
 August 6 – Rajendra Singh, Indian water conservationist, Magsaysay Award (2001)
 August 7 – Koenraad Elst, Belgian Indologist
 August 10 – Rosanna Arquette, American actress
 August 11
 Gustavo Cerati, Argentinian singer (d. 2014)
 Yoshiaki Murakami, Japanese investor
 August 12 – Kerry Boustead, Australian rugby league player  
 August 14
 Marcia Gay Harden, American actress
 Magic Johnson, African-American basketball player
 August 15 – Scott Altman, American astronaut
 August 17
 Chika Sakamoto, Japanese voice actress and singer
 Jonathan Franzen, American author
 David Koresh, American spiritualist, leader of the Branch Davidian religious cult (d. 1993)
 Brad Wellman, American baseball player
 August 18 – Dorothy Bush Koch, American author and philanthropist
 August 19 – Anthony Sowell, convicted serial killer and rapist
 August 21 – Jim McMahon, American football player
 August 25 – Sönke Wortmann, German film director
 August 26 – Stan Van Gundy, American basketball coach
 August 27 
 Juan Fernando Cobo, Colombian artist
Daniela Romo, Mexican singer, actress and TV hostess
 August 28 – Arthur Holden, Canadian actor and writer
 August 29
 Jeff Adachi, American attorney (d. 2019)
 Rebecca De Mornay, American actress
 Chris Hadfield, Canadian retired astronaut
 Stephen Wolfram, British scientist
 August 30 – Mark Jackson, Australian rules footballer and actor
 August 31 – Tony DeFranco, Canadian singer

September
 September 1 – Kenny Mayne, American sportscaster
 September 2 – Guy Laliberté, Canadian Cirque du Soleil founder
 September 4
 Kevin Harrington, Australian actor
 Armin Kogler, Austrian ski jumper
 September 6 – Gaetano Varcasia, Italian voice actor and theatre director (d. 2014)
 September 7 – Pierre Nanterme, French business executive (d. 2019)
 September 8
 Daler Nazarov, Tajik composer, singer and actor
 Saeko Shimazu, Japanese voice actress
 September 11 – John Hawkes, American actor
 September 12 – Sigmar Gabriel, German politician
 September 13
 Kathy Johnson, American artistic gymnast
 Chris Hansen, American journalist
 September 14
 Mary Crosby, American actress
 Morten Harket, Norwegian rock singer (A-ha)
 September 16 – Peter Keleghan, Canadian actor
 September 18
 Ian Bridge, Canadian footballer
 Sérgio Britto, Brazilian singer and keyboardist
Mark Romanek, American filmmaker 
 September 23
 Jason Alexander, American actor and comedian
 Elizabeth Peña, American actress (d. 2014)
 September 24 – Steve Whitmire, American puppeteer
 September 28 – Dantes Tsitsi, Nauruan politician
 September 29 – Benjamin Sehene, Rwandan writer
 September 30 – Ettore Messina, Italian basketball coach

October
 October 1 –  Youssou N'Dour, Senegalese singer
 October 2 – Lena Hades, Russian artist
 October 3
 Fred Couples, American golfer
 Jack Wagner, American actor
 October 4 – Chris Lowe, British musician
 October 7 – Simon Cowell, English music producer and television talent show judge
 October 8
 Erik Gundersen, Danish motorcycle racer
 Carlos I. Noriega, Peruvian-American colonel and astronaut
 October 9 – Boris Nemtsov, Russian politician (d. 2015)
 October 10
 Kirsty MacColl, British singer-songwriter (d. 2000)
 Julia Sweeney, American actress and comedian
 October 13 – Marie Osmond, American singer
 October 15
 Emeril Lagasse, American chef and restaurant owner
 Sarah, Duchess of York, British royal spouse
 October 17 – Francisco Flores Pérez, President of El Salvador (d. 2016)
 October 18 – Mauricio Funes, 44th President of El Salvador 
 October 20 - Hotman Paris Hutapea, Indonesian lawyer
 October 21 – Ken Watanabe, Japanese actor
 October 22 – Arto Salminen, Finnish writer (d. 2005)
 October 23
 "Weird Al" Yankovic, American singer and parodist
 Sam Raimi, American producer, writer and director
 October 25 –  Chrissy Amphlett, Australian rock singer (d. 2013)
 October 26 
 François Chau, American actor
 Evo Morales, President of Bolivia
 October 27 – Rick Carlisle, American basketball coach
 October 29 – John Magufuli, 5th President of Tanzania (d. 2021)
 October 31 – Neal Stephenson, American writer

November
 November 1 – John Odey, Nigerian politician (d. 2018)
 November 2 – Saïd Aouita, Moroccan athlete
 November 3 – Timothy Patrick Murphy, American actor (d. 1988)
 November 5 – Bryan Adams, Canadian singer and photographer
 November 8 – Selçuk Yula, Turkish football player and top scorer
 November 10
 Linda Cohn, American sports reporter
 Mackenzie Phillips, American actress
 Mike McCarthy, American football coach
 November 11 
 Parithi Ilamvazhuthi, Indian politician (d. 2018)
 Christian Schwarzenegger, Swiss legal scientist and professor
 November 14
 Deta Hedman, Jamaican-born English darts player
 Paul McGann, British actor
 Bryan Stevenson, American lawyer and social justice activist 
 November 16 – RaeAnn Kelsch, American politician (d. 2018)
 November 17 – William R. Moses, American actor
 November 18
 Jimmy Quinn, Northern Irish footballer and football manager
 Karla Faye Tucker, American convicted murderer (d. 1998)
 November 19
 Robert Barron, American bishop, author and theologian
 Jo Bonner, American U.S. Representative for Alabama's 1st congressional district
 Allison Janney, American actress
 November 20 – Sean Young, American actress
 November 23 – Dominique Dunne, American actress (d. 1982)
 November 24 – Akio Ōtsuka, Japanese voice actor and actor
 November 25 – Charles Kennedy, British politician (d. 2015)
 November 26 – Dai Davies Welsh politician and independent Member of Parliament (MP)
 November 27 – Viktoria Mullova, Russian violinist
 November 28 – Judd Nelson, American actor
 November 29
 Rahm Emanuel, American politician
 Platon Lebedev, Russian executive
 Neal Broten, American professional ice hockey player
 November 30
 George Faber, British television producer
 Sylvia Hanika, German tennis player
 Lorraine Kelly, British presenter and journalist

December
 December 1
 Billy Childish, English painter, writer and musician
 Wally Lewis, Australian rugby league player
 December 2 – Hans Kristian Amundsen, Norwegian newspaper editor and politician (d. 2018)
 December 3 – Kathy Jordan, American tennis player
 December 4 – Christa Luding-Rothenburger, German speed skater
 December 5 – Yoshitomo Nara, Japanese artist
 December 6 – Satoru Iwata, Japanese president of Nintendo (d. 2015)
 December 8 – Yun Duk-min, Korean diplomat
 December 9 
 Mario Cantone, American comedian, writer and actor 
 Karl Shuker, British zoologist, crypto-zoologist and author
 December 13 – Johnny Whitaker, American actor
 December 14 – Evan Ziporyn, American composer
 December 16
 Alison LaPlaca, American actress
 Steve Mattsson, American writer
 December 17 – Gregg Araki, American director
 December 19 – Waise Lee, Hong Kong actor
 December 20 – Stephen Chan Chi Wan, general manager of TVB
 December 21 – Florence Griffith Joyner, American athlete (d. 1998)
 December 22 – Bernd Schuster, German footballer and manager
 December 24 
 Keith Deller, English darts player
 Lee Daniels, American director and producer
 December 25 – Michael P. Anderson, American astronaut (d. 2003)
 December 27 – Gerina Dunwich, American author
 December 28 – Ana Torroja, Spanish singer
 December 29 
 Marco Antonio Solís, Mexican singer
 Patricia Clarkson, American actress
 December 30 – Tracey Ullman, British-American comedian and actress
 December 31
 Val Kilmer, American actor
 Baron Waqa, Nauruan politician and composer, 14th President of Nauru

Date unknown
Greg Cox, American novelist
Tom Grummett, Canadian comics artist
Jacki Randall, American artist

Deaths

January

 January 2 – William D. Francis, Australian botanist (b. 1889)
 January 3 – Edwin Muir, Scottish poet, novelist and translator (b. 1887)
 January 6 – José Enrique Pedreira, Puerto Rican composer (b. 1904)
 January 8 – Zhang Xi, Chinese politician (b. 1912)
 January 9 – Giuseppe Bottai, Italian Fascist journalist and politician (b. 1895)
 January 10 – Colin Gregory, Australian tennis player (b. 1903)
 January 14 
 Eivind Berggrav, Norwegian Lutheran bishop and reverend (b. 1884)
 G. D. H. Cole, English political theorist, economist and historian (b. 1889)
 January 16 – Eduardo Braun-Menéndez, Argentine physiologist (b. 1903)
 January 19 – Jennie Ross Cobb, American photographer (b. 1881)
 January 20 – Roger Gray, American actor (b. 1881)
 January 21
 Cecil B. DeMille, American film director (b. 1881)
 Frances Gertrude McGill, Canadian forensic pathologist (b. 1882)
 Carl Switzer, American actor (b. 1927)
 January 22 
 Elisabeth Moore, American tennis champion (b. 1876)
 Mike Hawthorn, English race car driver (b. 1929)
 January 25 – William Flannery, American director (b. 1898)
 January 26
 Margaret Elizabeth Egan, American librarian (b. 1905)
 MacGillivray Milne, United States Navy Captain and the 27th Governor of American Samoa (b. 1882)            
 January 28 – Walter Beall, American baseball player (b. 1899)

February

 February 1 – Frank Shannon, Irish-born American actor (b. 1874)
 February 3 – Killed in the crash of a private plane:
 The Big Bopper (J.P. Richardson), American rock singer (b. 1930)
 Buddy Holly, American rock singer  (b. 1936)
 Ritchie Valens, American rock singer (b. 1941)
 February 3
 Vincent Astor, American philanthropist (b. 1891)
 Herbert Greenwald, American real estate developer (b. 1915)
 Francesco De Robertis, Italian screenwriter, editor and director (b. 1902)
 Beulah Zachary, American television director and producer (Kukla, Fran and Ollie) (b. 1911)
 February 4 
 Una O'Connor, Irish actress (b. 1880)
 Robert Emerson, American scientist (b. 1903)
 February 7
 Nap Lajoie, American baseball player (Cleveland Indians) and a member of the MLB Hall of Fame (b. 1874)
 D. F. Malan, South African politician, 4th Prime Minister of South Africa (b. 1874)
 February 11 – Marshall Teague, American race car driver (b. 1921)
 February 12 – George Antheil, American composer (b. 1900)
 February 14 – Baby Dodds, American jazz musician (b. 1898)
 February 15
 Ralph Eastwood, British army officer (b. 1890)
 Sir Owen Richardson, British physicist, Nobel Prize laureate (b. 1879)
 February 17 – Luigi Emanueli, Italian engineer (b. 1883)
 February 18 – Gago Coutinho, Portuguese aviation pioneer (b. 1869)
 February 20 
 Gregório Bondar, Russian-Brazilian agronomist (b. 1881)
 Laurence Housman, English playwright and writer (b. 1865)
 February 22 – Helen Parrish, American actress (b. 1924)
 February 23 
 Pierre Frieden, Luxembourgish politician and writer, 18th Prime Minister of Luxembourg (b. 1892)
 Luis Palés Matos, Puerto Rican poet (b. 1898)
 February 25 – Klawdziy Duzh-Dushewski, Soviet architect, diplomat and journalist (b. 1891)
 February 26
 Princess Alexandra, 2nd Duchess of Fife, eldest grandchild of King Edward VII (b. 1891)
 Kōtoku Satō, Japanese general (b. 1893)
 Selig Suskin, Russian-born Israeli agronomist and early Zionist (b. 1873)
 February 27 – Shigeyoshi Miwa, Japanese admiral (b. 1892)
 February 28 
 Maxwell Anderson, American screenwriter (b. 1888)
 Beatrix Farrand, American gardener and architect (b. 1872)

March

 March 1 – Mack Gordon, American composer and lyricist (b. 1904)
 March 2 
 Zalman Ben-Ya'akov, Israel politician (b. 1897)
 Eric Blore, English actor (b. 1887)
 March 3 – Lou Costello, American actor and comedian (b. 1906)
 March 4
 Adolphe Danziger De Castro, Israeli scholar (b.  1859)
 Maxie Long, American athlete (b. 1878)
 March 6 
 Guido Brignone, Italian actor (b. 1886)
 Fred Stone, American actor (b. 1873)
 March 7 – Ichirō Hatoyama, Japanese politician, 36th Prime Minister of Japan (b. 1883)
 March 15 
 Shalva Dadiani, Soviet novelist (b. 1874)
 Lester Young, American jazz saxophonist (b. 1909)
 March 17 – Galaktion Tabidze, Georgian poet (b. 1891)
 March 19 – Umberto Barbaro, Italian critic (b. 1902)
 March 21 – Edwin Balmer, American science fiction and mystery writer (b. 1883)
 March 23 – Dominick Trcka, Czechoslovak Roman Catholic priest and blessed (b. 1886)
 March 24 – Abd al-Rahman al-Mahdi, Sudanese political figure and religious leader, Imam of the Ansar and 1st Prime Minister of Sudan (b. 1885)
 March 25 – Billy Mayerl, British pianist and composer (b. 1902)
 March 26 – Raymond Chandler, American-born novelist (b. 1888)
 March 27 – Grant Withers, American actor (b. 1905)
 March 28 – Lyubov Golanchikova, Soviet pilot (b. 1889)
 March 29 – Barthélemy Boganda, 1st Prime Minister of the Central African Republic (b. 1910)
 March 30 – Reginald R. Belknap, United States Navy rear admiral (b. 1871)

April

 April 2 – Nicholas Charnetsky, Soviet Orthodox priest, bishop, martyr and blessed (b. 1884)
 April 6 – Leo Aryeh Mayer, Israeli professor and scholar of Islamic art (b. 1895)
 April 8 
 Mario de Bernardi, Italian aviator (b. 1893)
 Marios Makrionitis, Greek Jesuit prelate and reverend (b. 1913)
 Jonathan Zenneck, German physicist and electrical engineer (b. 1871) 
 April 9 – Frank Lloyd Wright, American architect (b. 1867)
 April 12 – James Gleason, American actor, playwright and screenwriter (b. 1882)
 April 13 – Dagmar Hansen, Danish singer (b. 1871)
 April 15 – Leonard Beyers, South African army general (b. 1894)
 April 16 – Ramón Armando Rodríguez, Venezuelan writer (b. 1895)
 April 17 – Cecil Cunningham, American actress (b. 1888)
 April 18 – Irving Cummings, American actor (b. 1888)
 April 19 – Óscar Únzaga, Bolivian politician (assassinated) (b. 1916)
 April 25 - Count Michael Mikhailovich of Torby (b. 1898)
 April 28
 Alabert Fogarasi, Hungarian philosopher and politician (b. 1891)
 María Guggiari Echeverría, Paraguayan Roman Catholic religious professed and venerable (b. 1925)
 April 29 – Sir Kenneth Anderson, British general (b. 1891)

May

 May 3 – Troy Sanders, American film score composer (b. 1901)
 May 4 – William S. Pye, American admiral (b. 1880)
 May 5 
 Georges Grente, French Roman Catholic cardinal and eminence (b. 1872)
 Carlos Saavedra Lamas, Argentine politician, recipient of the Nobel Peace Prize (b. 1878)
 May 6 – Maria Dulęba, Polish actress (b. 1881)
 May 8 
 Renato Caccioppoli, Italian mathematician (b. 1904)
 Hector Choquette, Canadian politician (b. 1884)
 Ibrahim of Johor, Malaysian sultan (b. 1873)
 May 11 – Marcella Albani, Italian actress (b. 1899)
 May 14 – Sidney Bechet, American musician (b. 1897)
 May 15 
 Joe Cook, American actor (b. 1890)
 Jeanne de Flandreysy, French author (b. 1874)
 May 16 – Elisha Scott, Irish footballer (b. 1894)
 May 17 
 George Albert Smith, English film pioneer (b. 1864)
 Judite Teixeira, Portuguese writer (b. 1880)
 May 18
 Apsley Cherry-Garrard, Antarctic explorer (b. 1886)
 Enrique Guaita, Argentinian footballer (b. 1910)
 May 20 – Alfred Schütz, Austrian sociologist (b. 1899)
 May 22 – Henri Marchand, French actor (b. 1898)
 May 24 – John Foster Dulles, United States Secretary of State (b. 1888)
 May 29 – Ed Walsh, American baseball player (Chicago White Sox) and a member of the MLB Hall of Fame (b. 1881)
 May 30 
 Hesperia, Italian actress (b. 1885)
 Raúl Scalabrini Ortiz, Argentinian journalist (b. 1898)
 May 31 – Ede Zathureczky, Hungarian violinist (b. 1903)

June

 June 1 – Sax Rohmer, English author (b. 1883)
 June 3 – Sir Kinahan Cornwallis, British diplomat (b. 1883)
 June 4 – Charles Vidor, American director (b. 1900)
 June 8 – Pietro Canonica, Italian sculptor (b. 1869)
 June 9 
 Sonnie Hale, English actor and director (b. 1902)
 Adolf Windaus, German chemist, Nobel Prize laureate (b. 1876)
 June 12 – Clyde E. Elliott, American director, producer and writer (b. 1885)
 June 14 – Jerónimo Méndez, Chilean politician, acting President of the Republic (b. 1887)
 June 15 – Kazimierz Bein, Polish ophthalmologist (b. 1872)
 June 16 – George Reeves, American television actor (b. 1914)
 June 18
Ethel Barrymore, American stage and screen actress (b. 1879)
 Vincenzo Cardarelli, Italian poet (b. 1887)
 June 20 – Hitoshi Ashida, Japanese politician, 34th Prime Minister of Japan (b. 1887)
 June 22 
 Félix Guignot, French physician (b. 1882)
 Bruce Harlan, American Olympic diver (b. 1926)
 June 23 
 Cesare Maria De Vecchi, Italian soldier (b. 1884)
 Maria Gorczyńska, Polish actress (b. 1899)
 Boris Vian, French writer, poet, singer and musician (b. 1920)
 June 25
 Farajallah el-Helou, Lebanese militant (b. 1906)
 Charles Starkweather, American spree killer (b. 1938)
 June 27 
 Elias, Duke of Parma (b. 1880)
 Giovanni Pastrone, Italian actor, director and screenwriter (b. 1883)
 June 30 – José Vasconcelos, Mexican politician, writer and philosopher (b. 1882)

July

 July 2 – Sergei Chetverikov, Russian biologist (b. 1880)
 July 3 – Johan Bojer, Norwegian novelist and dramatist (b. 1872)
 July 6 – George Grosz, German artist (b. 1893)
 July 7 
 Hermenegildo Anglada Camarasa, Spanish painter (b. 1871)
 Ernest Newman, English music critic (b. 1868)
 July 11 – Charlie Parker, English cricketer (b. 1882)
 July 14 – Grock, Swiss clown (b. 1880)
 July 15
 Ernest Bloch, Swiss-born American composer (b. 1880)
 Agostino Gemelli, Italian Franciscan friar and reverend (b. 1878)
 July 17 – Billie Holiday, American singer (b. 1915)
 July 20 – William D. Leahy, American admiral (b. 1875)
 July 25
 Yitzhak HaLevi Herzog, Polish-born Chief Rabbi of Ireland, and later of Israel (b. 1888)
 King Mutara III of Rwanda (b. 1911)
 July 26 – Manuel Altolaguirre, Spanish poet (b. 1905)
 July 27 – Aleksandar Tsankov, 21st Prime Minister of Bulgaria (b. 1879)
 July 30
 Heinie Conklin, American actor (b. 1886)
 María Natividad Venegas de la Torre, Mexican Roman Catholic nun and saint (b. 1868)

August

 August 2 – Mary Teresa Norton, American politician (b. 1875)
 August 3
 Herb Byrne, Australian rules footballer (b. 1887)
 Fernando Carpi, Italian tenor (b. 1876)
 August 4 – Ioan Bălan, Romanian Orthodox prelate (b. 1880)
 August 5 – Edgar A. Guest, English poet (b. 1881)
 August 6 – Preston Sturges, American film director and writer (b. 1898)
 August 8 
 Albert Namatjira, Australian Aboriginal artist (b. 1902)
 Luigi Sturzo, Italian Roman Catholic priest and politician (b. 1871)
 Henry St. George Tucker, American Episcopal bishop and reverend (b. 1874)
 Luis Araquistáin, Spanish politician and writer (b. 1886)
 August 9
 Emil František Burian, Czechoslovak poet (b. 1904)
 Noboru Ishizaki, Japanese admiral (b. 1893)
 August 15 – Blind Willie McTell, American Piedmont blues singer and guitarist (b. 1901)
 August 16
Benny Fields, American singer (b. 1894)
 William Halsey, Jr., American US Navy Fleet admiral (b. 1882)
 Wanda Landowska, Polish harpsichordist (b. 1879)
 José Pessoa Cavalcanti de Albuquerque, Brazilian military officer (b.  1885)
 August 19 – Claude Grahame-White, British aviation pioneer (b. 1879)
 August 20 – Alexander Evreinov, Soviet Orthodox bishop and reverend (b. 1877)
 August 21 – Sir Jacob Epstein, American-born British sculptor (b. 1880)
 August 22
 Marie Luise Droop, German writer, producer and director (b. 1890)
 Allan Aynesworth, English actor and producer (b. 1864)
 August 28
 Raphael Lemkin, international lawyer (b. 1900)
 Bohuslav Martinů, Czech composer (b. 1890)

September

 September 6
 Edmund Gwenn, English actor (b. 1877)
 Kay Kendall, English actress (b. 1927)
 September 7 – Maurice Duplessis, Premier of Quebec (b. 1890)
 September 9 – Ramón Fonst, Cuban fencer (b. 1883)
 September 11 – Paul Douglas, American actor (b. 1907)
 September 14 – Wayne Morris, American actor (b. 1914)
 September 18 – Adolf Ziegler,  German painter (b. 1892)
 September 20 – Nikandr Chibisov, Russian commander (b. 1892)
 September 22 
 Josef Matthias Hauer, Austrian composer and music theorist (b. 1883)
 Edmund Ironside, 1st Baron Ironside, British field marshal (b. 1880)
 September 24 – Wolfgang Paalen, German-Austrian-Mexican painter, sculptor and art philosopher (b. 1905)
 September 25
 S. W. R. D. Bandaranaike, 4th Prime Minister of Ceylon (b. 1899)
 Helen Broderick, American actress (b. 1891)
 September 28
 Rudolf Caracciola, German race car driver (b. 1901)
 Oscar Griswold, American general (b. 1886)
 Vinnie Richards, American tennis player (b. 1903)
 September 30 – Taylor Holmes, American actor (b. 1878)

October

 October 1 – Enrico De Nicola, Italian jurist, politician and journalist, 1st President of Italy (b. 1877)
 October 6 – Bernard Berenson, American art historian (b. 1865)
 October 7 – Mario Lanza, American tenor (b. 1921)
 October 9 – Shirō Ishii, Japanese microbiologist and lieutenant general of Unit 731 (b. 1892)
 October 11 – Bert Bell, 2nd commissioner of the National Football League (b. 1895)
 October 12 
 Edward Keane, American actor (b. 1884)
 Arnolt Bronnen, Austrian playwright and director (b. 1895)
 October 14 – Errol Flynn, Australian actor (b. 1909)
 October 15 – Stepan Bandera, Ukrainian nationalist leader (b. 1909)
 October 16
 Minor Hall, American jazz musician (b. 1897)
 George C. Marshall, United States Secretary of State, recipient of the Nobel Peace Prize (b. 1880)
 October 18 
 Boughera El Ouafi, Algerian athlete (b. 1898)
 Frederick J. Horne, American admiral (b. 1880)
 October 19 – Ebrahim Hakimi, 29th Prime Minister of Iran (b. 1869)
 October 20 – Werner Krauss, German actor (b. 1884)
 October 22 – Joseph Cahill, Australian politician (b. 1891)
 October 25 – Genevieve R. Cline, American jurist (b. 1879)
 October 27 – Juan José Domenchina, Spanish poet (b. 1898)
 October 28 
 Lili Árkayné Sztehló, Hungarian painter (b. 1897)
 Camilo Cienfuegos, Cuban revolutionary (b. 1932)
 October 29  – King Sisavang Vong of Laos (b. 1885)

November

 November 1
 M. K. Thyagaraja Bhagavathar, Tamil film actor and producer (b. 1910)
 Zhang Jinghui, Chinese general and politician, second and final Prime Minister of Manchukuo (b. 1871)
 November 2 – Federico Tedeschini, Italian Roman Catholic cardinal and eminence (b. 1873)
 November 4 
 George Karslidis, Greek Orthodox priest, elder and saint (b. 1901)
 Friedrich Waismann, Austrian mathematician, physicist and philosopher (b. 1896)
 November 6 
 José P. Laurel, Filipino politician and judge, 3rd President of the Philippines (b. 1891)
 Ivan Leonidov, Russian architect (b. 1902)
 November 7 
 Muhammad Mahabat Khan III, Nawab of Junagarh (b. 1900)
 Victor McLaglen, English actor and boxer (b. 1886) 
 November 8 – Frank S. Land, founder of the Order of DeMolay (b. 1890)
 November 10 – Lupino Lane, British actor (b. 1892)
 November 15 – Charles Thomson Rees Wilson, Scottish physicist, Nobel Prize laureate (b. 1869)
 November 17 – Heitor Villa-Lobos, Brazilian composer (b. 1887)
 November 18 – Arthur Q. Bryan, American actor, voice actor, comedian and radio personality (b. 1899)
 November 19 – Joseph Charbonneau, Canadian Roman Catholic prelate and reverend (b. 1892)
 November 20 – Alfonso López Pumarejo, Colombian political figure, 2-time President of Colombia (b. 1886)
 November 21 
 Max Baer, American boxer and actor (b. 1909)
 Olav Meisdalshagen, Norwegian politician, Minister of Finance (b. 1903)
 November 22 – Molla Mallory, American tennis champion (b. 1884)
 November 24 
 Stepan Erzia, Russian sculptor (b. 1876)
 Ion Gigurtu, 42nd Prime Minister of Romania (b. 1886)
 Dally Messenger, Australian rugby league player (b. 1883)
 November 25 – Gérard Philipe, French actor (b. 1922)
 November 29 – Hans Henny Jahnn,  German playwright and novelist (b. 1894)

December

 December 2 – Giuseppe Zucca, Italian screenwriter (b. 1887)
 December 3 – Juozapas Skvireckas, Soviet Orthodox archbishop and reverend (b. 1873)
 December 4 – Hubert Marischka, Austrian film director (b. 1882)
 December 7 
 Charlie Hall, English actor (b. 1899)
 Prince Kuni Asaakira (b. 1901)
 December 9 – Donald MacDonald, American actor (b. 1898)
 December 11 – Jim Bottomley, American baseball player (St. Louis Cardinals) and a member of the MLB Hall of Fame (b. 1900)
 December 12 
 Marcella Craft, American soprano (b. 1874)
 Russell Simpson, American actor (b. 1880)
 December 14 
 Edna Wallace Hopper, American stage actress (b. 1872)
 Stanley Spencer, British painter (b. 1891)
 December 19 – Andrés Martínez Trueba, 31st President of Uruguay (b. 1884)
 December 22 – Gilda Gray, Polish-born dancer and actress (b. 1901)
 December 23 – Edward Wood, 1st Earl of Halifax, British politician (b. 1881)
 December 24 – Edmund Goulding, American director (b. 1891)
 December 28 – Ante Pavelic, Croatian fascist leader and WWII war criminal (b. 1889)
 December 29 – Juan José Morosoli, Uruguayan writer (b. 1899)

Unknown
 Al-Abbas ibn Ibrahim as-Samlali, Moroccan historian (b. 1877)
 Elena Săcălici, Romanian artistic gymnast (b. 1935)

Nobel Prizes

 Physics – Emilio Gino Segrè, Owen Chamberlain
 Chemistry – Jaroslav Heyrovský
 Physiology or Medicine – Severo Ochoa, Arthur Kornberg
 Literature – Salvatore Quasimodo
 Peace – Philip Noel-Baker

Notes

References